Joseph C. Montague served in the California legislature and during the Mexican–American War he served in the US Army.

References

American military personnel of the Mexican–American War
Members of the California State Legislature
19th-century American politicians
Year of birth missing
Year of death missing